Yeşim Demirel (born April 19, 1990) is a Turkish-German women's football forward currently playing in the 2nd Women's Football Bundesliga South (2. Frauen Bundesliga Süd) for Karlsruher SC in Germany with jersey number 9. She is a member of the Turkey women's national football team since 2011.

Playing career

Club
She started playing football for TSG Hoffenheim Women in the 2009–10 season. After two seasons, she transferred to 1. FFC 08 Niederkirchen. In the 2013–14 season, Demirel joined the women's team of Karlsruher SC.

International
Demirel was called up for the Turkey women's national team debuting in the friendly match against the Greek women on April 27, 2011. She played in the UEFA Women's Euro 2013 qualifying – Group 2 matches for Turkey.

References

External links
 

1990 births
People from Sinsheim
Sportspeople from Karlsruhe (region)
German people of Turkish descent
Living people
German women's footballers
Turkish women's footballers
Women's association football forwards
Turkey women's international footballers
Footballers from Baden-Württemberg
1. FFC 08 Niederkirchen players